Amar Prakash, K.C.S.I., K.C.I.E., was the Maharaja of Sirmur State from 1911 until 1933.

Biography 
Amar Prakash was born on 26 January 1888 to Surendra Bikram Prakash, Raja of Sirmur. He was educated privately and received administrative training during the time of his father. He succeeded to the Gaddi on the death of his father in 1911. He was installed on the Gaddi by Sir Louis Dane, the Lieutenant-Governor of the Punjab. He married Mandalsa Devi, eldest daughter of Dev Shumsher Jang Bahadur Rana, ex-Prime Minister of Nepal.
 Mahima Kumari.
 Rajendra Prakash.
 Premlata Kumari.

He died of meningitis in Vienna on 13 August 1933. He was succeeded by his son, Rajendra Prakash as the Maharaja of Sirmur.

References 

British India
1888 births
1933 deaths